The Home Office, a United Kingdom government department, has, from August 2005 to 31 March 2009, excluded 101 individuals from the UK for having "engaged in unacceptable behaviour". Of those, 22 were excluded by then-Home Secretary Jacqui Smith between 28 October 2008 and 31 March 2009. On 5 May 2009 Smith publicly "named and shamed" sixteen of those individuals. In addition to the sixteen, other people are or have been banned from the United Kingdom.

The individuals are not necessarily banned from the British overseas territories, which have their own immigration regulations.

Smith's successor as Home Secretary, Alan Johnson, ended the policy of naming people who are banned from entering Britain.

Home Office 2009 list of hate promoters 
The following 16 names were published:

Other notable individuals banned or refused entry

The following individuals are temporarily or permanently refused entry into the United Kingdom.

Individuals previously banned or refused entry

These individuals have at some point been banned from entering the United Kingdom, or at least temporarily refused entry; these individuals are either deceased or have eventually been allowed entry.

Notes

References

External links
 Home Office statement

Immigration to the United Kingdom
Banned from entering the United Kingdom
United Kingdom
United Kingdom
People banned from entering